Nicole Arbour is a Canadian comedian, choreographer, singer, actress and YouTuber.

Career 
Arbour is a former cheerleader for the Toronto Raptors of the National Basketball Association. While studying at Humber College, she started her cheerleading career and led the Humber Hype dance team which won two national championships.

Acting 
As an actress, she appeared in Howie Do It, and Silent But Deadly. Arbour's single "Bang Bang" was released on April 30, 2013. On June 18, 2015, her single and music video to "Fun Revolution" was released and was the first Periscope music video to debut. In April 2015, Arbour was nominated as a finalist for "Best Comedian" for the Shorty Awards, won by Hannibal Buress. Arbour released a single and self-directed music video to “Show Me How You Werk” on December 4, 2017.

Choreographer and hosting work 
She has worked as a choreographer for professional cheerleading teams, award shows, and recording artists including Omi's "Cheerleader" performance in 2015 Much Music Video Awards, 2013 Much Music Video Awards and CFL Argos Cheerleaders.

Arbour has been the host of a number of major events and tours including Style New York Fashion Week at Madison Square Garden, Virgin Mobile "National Fearless Day" with Richard Branson, City Fest Toronto and LG National Texting Championships 2008–2009. She also worked for brands on their marketing campaigns including Virgin Mobile, Axe and Molson Canadian's "Guy Code Campaign". Arbour was featured in Adweek magazine in April 2017 for her work in an advertisement of PMD's Lip Plumping Device.

Filmography

Film

Television

Awards and recognition

Controversies

"Dear Fat People" video 
In September 2015, Arbour became the subject of controversy when she posted a viral video on her YouTube channel titled "Dear Fat People". Critics argued that the video endorses fat shaming. The video was temporarily unavailable on YouTube, over claims that it violated the YouTube terms of service, but was later restored.

Arbour was the subject of both public and celebrity criticism, with plus-size model Ashley Graham labelling her comments as "disgusting".

Soon after the video was released, Canadian director Pat Mills stated publicly that he had considered hiring Arbour as a choreographer for his then-upcoming film Don't Talk to Irene after meeting with her, but that he then saw "Dear Fat People" and it "made me never want to see her again". This was reported as Arbour having been "fired" from the film, but in fact no job offer had been extended.

On September 16, 2015, Arbour appeared on The View to defend the "Dear Fat People" video, stating that "that video wasn’t made to offend people...it's just satire," that she wasn't targeting those with medical conditions, and that the video wasn't supposed to be taken seriously. Time magazine stated, "Arbour doesn't see her comments as bullying, but rather an intense form of truth-telling". Arbour was quoted in the Time article saying:
I find seeing someone's head being blown off offensive ... I find children starving in a country with more than enough food offensive. I find women's bodies being mutilated for religious purposes, that is offensive to me. But words and satire I don't find offensive.

Arbour has put out other similarly named satirical videos, including "Dear Black People", "Dear Feminists", "Dear Sluts" and "Dear Refugees".

Domestic abuse allegations 
On January 11, 2016, YouTube personality Matthew Santoro posted "My Abuse Story", a video in which he claimed he had been in a physically and emotionally abusive relationship. In the video, he did not name who his abuser was but people eventually figured out that he was referring to Arbour. The video was originally set to private after Santoro ended the relationship but was accidentally made public. Santoro claimed he was manipulated into isolating himself from his friends and family because of Arbour's jealousy, and was later even slapped in the face by Arbour. Arbour denied the allegations in a YouTube video. Santoro has since removed his original video.

Political statements
Arbour said she once identified with the Liberal Party of Canada, but in 2020 said she no longer did.

In a YouTube video in 2018 Arbour said that some people overreact when dealing with racial and gender issues, and that less focus should be spent on the institution of slavery which ended in the 19th century, and more focus should be spent on current issues stemming from it such as the racial wealth gap, marijuana legalization, police reform, and reforming the way media covers crime and arrests. Several of her social media posts received widespread criticism in 2018 for their perceived cultural appropriation and lack of empathy.

References

External links 
 
 
 Nicole Arbour on YouTube

1980s births
21st-century Canadian actresses
21st-century Canadian comedians
21st-century Canadian women singers
Actresses from Hamilton, Ontario
Canadian cheerleaders
Canadian choreographers
Canadian female dancers
Canadian women comedians
Canadian YouTubers
Comedians from Ontario
Living people
Musicians from Hamilton, Ontario
National Basketball Association cheerleaders
Social media influencers
Canadian women choreographers
YouTube controversies